Ekaterina Afinogenova (born 15 January 1987) is a retired Russian female tennis player.

Afinogenova has won one doubles title on the ITF tour in her career. On 8 October 2007, she reached her best singles ranking of 219. On 9 July 2007, she peaked at 273 in the doubles rankings.

Afinogenova made her WTA main draw debut at the 2007 Istanbul Cup. Afinogenova played her last match in 2010, and officially retired from the sport in 2016.

Tennis career

2007
She qualified for the main draw of the 2007 Istanbul Cup by defeating Kateryna Polunina, Casey Dellacqua and Mervana Jugić-Salkić. In the first round, she defeated German Sandra Klösel, but lost to Meghann Shaughnessy in the second.

In June, she participated in the WTA tournament of Barcelona in Spain endowed with $145,000 She qualified won German Carmen Klaschka and Georgian Margalita Chakhnashvili but lost In the final round against the Argentine María Emilia Salerni. Doubles with a partner the Belarusian Ekaterina Dzehalevich , they hoisted the Quarterfinals lost, beaten by the pair composed of Nuria Llagostera Vives and Arantxa Parra Santonja.

Personal life 
Her older brother is professional ice hockey player Maxim Afinogenov. She is married to professional ice hockey player Max Pacioretty since 2011. They have four sons and one daughter together.

In 2017, Afinogenova co-founded The Latte Co., a milk-substitute company specializing in plant-based powder formulas for babies older than 12 months and children younger than 8 years.

Career statistics

Singles Finals: 4 (0–4)

Doubles: 4 (1–3)

References

External links
 
 

1987 births
Living people
Russian female tennis players
Place of birth missing (living people)